The Movilnet Tower is an office skyscraper the stands at a height of 125 metres with 28 floors, located in the Francisco Fajardo Highway up to the Sabana Grande area in the parish El Recreo of Caracas, Venezuela.

See also 
List of tallest buildings in South America

References 
https://www.emporis.com/buildings/182261/torre-movilnet-caracas-venezuela
Office buildings completed in 1999
Buildings and structures in Caracas
Twin towers
Skyscraper office buildings in Venezuela
1999 establishments in Venezuela